Ferruccio Valobra (12 April 1898 – 22 September 1944) was an Italian partisan and antifascist.

Life
Ferruccio Valobra was born in Turin from a Jewish family. Captain of the Alpini during the First World War, he was decorated with the Silver Medal of Military Valor.

In the post-war period he worked as an industrial expert and sales representative. He was married and father of a child. Radiated from the army following the 1938 Fascist racial laws, at the outbreak of the Second World War he was forced to displace to Carmagnola in the frazione of San Bernardo. Of anti-fascist ideas, he joined the Italian Republican Party, then clandestine.

After the Badoglio Proclamation of 8 September 1943 he took part at the Carmagnola's resistance and became commander (Capitano Rossi) of a partisan group operating in the surrounding area. Betrayed by an anonymous delator on 8 September 1944, he was incarcerated and tortured by elements of the Fascist Guardia Nazionale Repubblicana, the so-called repubblichini. He was sentenced to death by firing squad on 21 September 1944 and he was executed the following day in the Martinetto shooting range in Turin. Before his death, Valobra managed to write two letters, which ended with the words addressed to his wife and daughter:

I hope that my sacrifice like that of my companions will serve to give you a better tomorrow, in a more beautiful Italy as you and I have always desired in the depths of our soul.

Ferruccio Valobra is buried in the Jewish cemetery of Carmagnola. The central street of the town is dedicated to him today. In the current Martinetto Shrine there is a plaque commemorating his sacrifice.

See also
Jewish resistance in German-occupied Europe

Notes

1898 births
1944 deaths
Italian military personnel of World War I
Italian anti-fascists
Italian resistance movement members
Recipients of the Silver Medal of Military Valor
Military personnel from Turin
Jewish anti-fascists
20th-century Italian Jews
Businesspeople from Turin
Italian civilians killed in World War II
People executed by Italy by firing squad